The Roman Catholic Diocese of Danlí is a Latin suffragan bishopric in the ecclesiastical province (covering all Honduras) of the Metropolitan Archbishop of Tegucigalpa, with see at Danlí, in southern Honduras's El Paraíso department (but not its capital).

Its cathedral episcopal is the Catedral de la Inmaculata Concepción, devoted to the Immaculate Conception, in Danlí.

History 
The diocese was erected on 2 January 2017 by Pope Francis, on Honduran territory split off from that of its Metropolitan mother see, the Archdiocese of Tegucigalpa. It was immediately subject to the Roman Congregation for Bishops, without a (semi-)missionary stage.

Episcopal ordinaries
Its first and present Suffragan Bishop is José Antonio Canales Motiño, bishop-elect since 2 January 2017, a secular cleric, born on 19 March 1962 in Honduras, ordained Priest on 12 October 1996.

See also 
 List of Catholic dioceses in Honduras

References

Sources and external links
 GCatholic - data for all sections

Roman Catholic dioceses in Honduras
Roman Catholic Ecclesiastical Province of Tegucigalpa